is a 1992 turn-based tactical role-playing game for the Mega Drive/Genesis console. While primarily a traditional fantasy-themed game, it contains some science fiction elements.

The game has been repeatedly re-released: in Sega Smash Pack Volume 1 for the Dreamcast and Sega Smash Pack 2 for Microsoft Windows, in Sonic's Ultimate Genesis Collection for Xbox 360 and PlayStation 3, and as a standalone game for the Wii Virtual Console and Microsoft Windows via Steam. Additionally, in 2004 a remake was released for the Game Boy Advance under the title Shining Force: Resurrection of the Dark Dragon and in 2010 the game was released for iOS but was discontinued in 2015. It was re-released again on the Nintendo Switch Online + Expansion Pack in 2021.

Gameplay

Shining Force is a turn-based tactical role-playing game. Battles take place in square grids, and each unit occupies one square. Each unit can move up to a fixed amount of squares along the battlefield, determined by its Move statistic. Depending on its location relative to enemies and to allies, a unit can also perform one action: attack, cast a spell, use an item, or search the area. Some commands, such as equipping or dropping items, do not count as actions. The order of turns is determined by the unit's agility score and a random seed.

As is most common for the RPG genre, units become stronger by fighting enemies or by performing other actions in battle, such as healing allies. These actions give the units experience points (EXP), which allow them to gain levels.

In Shining Force, each allied unit is represented by a character with his or her own background and personality, much like in the Fire Emblem series. Although there are no "generic" units, except on the enemy side, most characters contribute little or nothing to the plot upon joining the player army.

Each allied unit also has a class, which defines a set of abilities for that unit and determines the spells and equipment they have access to. A unit can be promoted to another class at any level between 10 or 20. Upon promotion the character's level resets to 1 and statistics are reduced by a fixed amount, although they begin higher if the character had been promoted at a higher level.

Battle goals for the player are fairly simple: kill all enemies, kill the enemies' leader, or advance to a town or landmark. The enemy side wins if they kill the player's leader, Max, or if the player chooses to escape the battle by casting Egress. Even if the player army is defeated, the player can recover allies and retry the battle. The Force keeps any experience that is obtained, regardless of the battle's outcome. Thus, there is no Game Over, and the player's army gets stronger even upon its defeat, although Max's death results in the player losing half of their money.

Shining Force also possesses an exploration mode that occurs outside of battle. This gameplay mode is essentially a Japanese-style traditional RPG, along the lines of Final Fantasy or Dragon Quest, although there are no labyrinths and few puzzles to solve. In this mode, the player's army is represented by Max, who is able to walk around, interact with people, find treasure, buy equipment and items, outfit the army, and choose which of the army's members will be used in battle.

Plot
The game opens in the Kingdom of Guardiana, in the land of Rune. The protagonist, Max, is sent on a mission to prevent the evil Kane, who commands the hordes of Runefaust, from opening the Shining Path and resurrecting Dark Dragon. Along the way, Max recruits a number of allies to join the Shining Force. They eventually find that both Kane and King Ramladu are under the control of the manipulative Darksol. Darksol ultimately succeeds in reviving Dark Dragon, but Max seals the creature away using the power of the Chaos Breaker, a sword created by merging a sword of light with Kane's sword of darkness.

Shining series continuity
Shining Force: The Legacy of Great Intention begins the saga of Guardiana that is continued in Shining Force Gaiden. It tells how Anri became Queen of Guardiana, and relates the adventures of several Shining Force characters.

Shining Force also tells how Max and Adam's blood feud with Mishaela began, giving rise to the events of Shining Force Gaiden: Final Conflict. Kane and Elliot appear as major characters, and the game shows how each one met his end.

Development
Despite being the sequel to the successful Shining in the Darkness, Sega allotted only a minimal budget to the development of Shining Force. Contrary to popular assumption, Shining Force was not influenced by archetypal tactical RPG Fire Emblem: Shadow Dragon and the Blade of Light. In fact, when asked about the game, lead Shining Force developer Hiroyuki Takahashi remarked: "The tempo of that title was so bad that it wasn't something I even wanted to play." Takahashi recalled that Shining Force was chiefly inspired by Dragon Quest. Asking himself how he and the rest of the development team could "take the battles from Dragon Quest and make them more fun", he drew inspiration from an obscure Japanese PC game called Silver Ghost, "a simulation action type of game where you had to direct, oversee and command multiple characters."

Reception

In Japan, it topped the Famitsu sales chart in April 1992.

The game was well received. Mega placed the game at #33 in their Top Mega Drive Games of All Time.

Retrospective

In 2004, readers of Retro Gamer voted this "truly unique RPG masterpiece" 86th top retro game, with the staff additionally calling it "one of the greatest Megadrive games of all time and a definite office favourite."

Remake
The game was remade in 2004 for the Game Boy Advance under the title Shining Force: Resurrection of the Dark Dragon. The changes included an expanded plot, three new playable characters, three new battles, ramping difficulty system, and some tweaks in the gameplay. One of the new characters can use "cards" in battle, and turn order is determined solely by a unit's speed stat and can be checked at any time from a list, allowing the player to plan out battles with greater certainty. The remake features a ramping difficulty system: every time a play-through is successfully completed, a player earns a star and all enemies get a boost in stats for the next play-through. The game has also had a rerelease for iOS, which has been removed from the App Store by Sega.

GameSpot named Resurrection of the Dark Dragon the best Game Boy Advance game of July 2004.

References

External links
Shining Force at MobyGames

1992 video games
Amusement Vision games
Camelot Software Planning games
Fantasy video games
Game Boy Advance games
IOS games
Nintendo Switch Online games
Role-playing video games
Sega Genesis games
Shining (series)
Steampunk video games
Tactical role-playing video games
Video games developed in Japan
Virtual Console games
Windows games